John Rodney Niland  (born 10 September 1940) is an Australian academic and board director. Niland obtained a Bachelor and Master of Commerce from UNSW and his PhD is from the University of Illinois. He has held academic positions at Cornell University, The Australian National University, and UNSW. He served as a mediator of labour disputes in the US while at Cornell, and in Australia has undertaken extensive academic and policy work in conflict resolution, theory and practice, particularly enterprise bargaining.

John Niland is a Professor Emeritus of UNSW and was its fourth Vice Chancellor and President (1992-2002) . Before that he was the Dean of the Faculty of Commerce and Economics. While UNSW Vice-Chancellor, he was a founding director of both Universitas 21 and Australia’s Group of Eight Universities. He also served a term as President of the Australian Vice-Chancellors' Committee, and was a member of the Prime Minister's Science, Engineering and Innovation Council.

The University of New South Wales’s most recognised and architecturally renowned building, the Scientia, was officially renamed The John Niland Scientia Building for his long and distinguished history at the University . He is said to have led the University through a golden age which included significant internationalisation and campus revitalisation . In 2007 he received the President’s Prize of the Royal Australian Institute of Architects for the UNSW campus redevelopment. 

Until recently, he chaired the International Academic Review Panel of Singapore Management University, having been closely involved with SMU since its founding in 2000.  In August 2018, SMU awarded Niland an honorary Doctor of Letters for services to the university.  He continues to be consulted for strategic advice by university leaders in Asia and Australia

John Niland has held a range of other academic, community and corporate positions, including:

 Independent Director, Macquarie Bank Limited and Macquarie Group Limited
 President, National Trust of Australia (NSW)
 Chairman, realestate.com.au Limited
 Chairman, Campus Living Funds Management Limited (CLV)
 Chairman, Centennial Park & Moore Park Trust
 Member, University Grants Committee of Hong Kong
 Member, Australian Universities Council
 Chairman, Research Australia 
 Deputy Chairman, Board of Trustees of Singapore Management University
 Chief Executive, State Pollution Control Commission 
 Chairman, Environment Protection Authority (NSW)
 Member, Board of St Vincent's Hospital, Sydney; Deputy Chairman, the Garvin Institute of Medical Research
 Member, Board of Sydney Symphony Foundation
 Member, Sydney Olympic bid’s Building Commission
 President, Federation of Australian University Staff Associations (FAUSA)

Niland became an Officer of the Order of Australia (AO) for services to industrial relations research and reform in 1992 and in 2001 became a Companion of the Order of Australia (AC), Australia's highest civilian honour, for services to education .

External links
 Macquarie Bank Profile
 Centennial Parklands Profile
 SMU Citation
Radio National, 2001
Sydney Morning Herald, January 1996
Sydney Morning Herald, April 1996
The Australian, 1996
Sydney Morning Herald, 1989
The Bulletin, 1989

1940 births
Living people
Cornell University faculty
University of New South Wales alumni
Companions of the Order of Australia
Vice-Chancellors of the University of New South Wales